The Laura Hurd Award is an annual award given to the top player in NCAA Division III Women's Ice Hockey. It is given by the American Hockey Coaches Association. It was known as the Division III Women's Player of the Year Award prior to 2007.

In January 2007, the AHCA voted to rename the Division III Women's Player of the Year after Laura Hurd, who played collegiately at Elmira College and was killed in a car accident in 2006, a year after winning the award. Hurd holds the NCAA Division III record for career scoring with 237 points over four years; she was a four-time All-American and led Elmira to two national championships.

Award winners

Winners by school

Winners by position

See also
Patty Kazmaier Award - D-I women
Sid Watson Award - D-III men
Hobey Baker Award - D-I men

References

College ice hockey player of the year awards in the United States
College women's ice hockey in the United States
NCAA Division III women's ice hockey
Elmira College